Honda Dream may refer to any of the following Honda motorcycles:

 D-Type (1949), Honda's first complete motorcycle
 C71, C76, C72, C77 Dream (1960–1967)
 Dream CB250 (1968–1969)
 Super Cub EX5 Dream (1986–), a.k.a. Honda Astrea, or Dream 110i (2011– )
 AC15 or Dream 50 (1997–1998)
 Dream Yuga (2012– )
 Honda Dream C125 (2000–) Cambodia, Burma

Dream